IJhorst is a village in the eastern Netherlands, within the municipality of Staphorst, Overijssel. Its population is about 1,500.

The village is a recreational center of Staphorst, popular for walking and biking through fields and forests. There are several campsites.

The Reest is a small creek that runs along IJhorst from the ice ages.

External links

The Reformed Church cemetery in the village has the graves of Baron Frederik van Pallandt and his only son, the scriptwriter, Nicolas van Pallandt.

Populated places in Overijssel
Staphorst